The 2016 Maryland Democratic presidential primary was held on April 26 in the U.S. state of Maryland as one of the Democratic Party's primaries ahead of the 2016 presidential election.

The Democratic Party's primaries in Connecticut, Delaware, Pennsylvania and Rhode Island were held the same day, as were Republican primaries in the same five states, including their own Maryland primary.

Opinion polling

Results

Results by county
Hillary Clinton won every county (and the independent city of Baltimore) with the exceptions of Allegany, Carroll, Cecil, and Garrett counties, which went for Bernie Sanders.

Note: Maryland is a closed primary state. Turnout is based on registered democrats before the primary on April 26, 2016. Others vote totals consist of votes for Rocky De La Fuente and Uncommitted

Analysis
With its coalition of African Americans and college-educated, affluent white progressive/liberal professionals, Maryland was a state Hillary Clinton was expected to win in the so-called "Acela Primaries" on April 26. She swept the state on election day, winning the primary by 29 points, a clear difference from 2008 when she lost Maryland to Barack Obama. According to exit polls, 43 percent of voters in the Maryland Democratic Primary were white and they opted for Clinton by a margin of 52-42 compared to the 46 percent of African American voters who backed Clinton by a margin of 75-22. Clinton swept all socioeconomic/income classes and educational attainment categories in Maryland as well. She won the votes of people over the age of 45, 75-20, but lost the youth vote to Sanders 52-46. She won both men (55-40) and women (68-29).

In terms of party identification, of the 80 percent of self-identified Democrats who voted in the primary, 69 percent backed Clinton while 30 percent supported Bernie Sanders; Independents, who made up 17 percent of the voters, backed Sanders by a 51-39 margin. Clinton also won all ideological groups.

Clinton performed well in the urban and suburban parts of the state in and around Baltimore (which she won 63-34), and the Washington, D.C. suburbs (which she won 71-27), and she also won in the more rural parts of the state like the Eastern Shore (which she won 57-37) and Western Maryland (which she won 53-47), which includes parts of Appalachia.

See also
 2016 Maryland Republican presidential primary

References

Maryland
Democratic primary
2016